Post or POST commonly refers to:
Mail, the postal system, especially in Commonwealth of Nations countries
An Post, the Irish national postal service
Canada Post, Canadian postal service
Deutsche Post, German postal service
Iraqi Post, Iraqi postal service
Russian Post, Russian postal service
Hotel post, a service formerly offered by remote Swiss hotels for the carriage of mail to the nearest official post office
United States Postal Service or USPS
Parcel post, a postal service for mail that is heavier than ordinary letters
Post, a job or occupation

Post, POST, or posting may also refer to:

Architecture and structures
Lamppost, a raised source of light on the edge of a road
Post (structural), timber framing
Post and lintel, a building system
 Steel fence post
Trading post
Utility pole or utility post

Military
Military base, an assigned station or a guard post
Outpost (military), a military outpost
Guardpost, or guardhouse

Geography
Post, Iran, a village in West Azerbaijan Province of Iran
Post, Oregon, a community at the geographic center of the U.S. state of Oregon
Post, Texas, the county seat of Garza County, Texas, United States

People
Post (surname)
Post Malone, a hip hop artist
C.W. Post, founder of Post Cereals
George Edward Post, American surgeon, botanist (abbrev. Post), and academic

Dentistry
Post and core, a type of dental restoration

Organology 
 Key post, a mechanical fixed part of woodwind keywork system

Arts, entertainment, and media

Staffing

Albums
Post (Björk album), her second solo studio album, released in 1995
Post (Paul Kelly album), his first solo studio album, released in 1985
Post-,  a 2018 album by Jeff Rosenstock

Other uses in music
Post, an alternative name for a hanger (barbershop music)
Post Records, a record label
Post, a prominent musical change during the intro of a recording, as used in the production of radio programming

Periodicals
Australasian Post, a defunct Australian weekly magazine
Post Magazine, a British magazine first published in 1840
The Post (disambiguation), a list of newspapers
The Saturday Evening Post, an American magazine

Communications
Post, an entry in a blog or an Internet forum; see posting style
Part-of-speech tagging or POST, the process of marking up a word in a text (corpus) as corresponding to a particular part of speech
Postscript, a sentence, paragraph, or longer text addended to a main document, such as a letter

Computing and technology
POST (HTTP), an HTTP request method
.post, the internet top-level domain
Power-on self-test or POST, start-up routines on electronic devices, typically on computers

Education and training
LIU Post, one of the two campuses of Long Island University in the U.S. state of New York, formerly known as C.W. Post.
Peace Officer Standards and Training or POST, state-level training program for American law-enforcement officers
Post University, a university in the U.S. state of Connecticut

Organizations and companies
Parliamentary Office of Science and Technology or POST, in the United Kingdom
Peninsula Open Space Trust, a land trust in California
Post Holdings, a consumer packaged goods holding company
Post Cereals, a packaged food subsidiary of Post Holdings

Sports
Post (basketball), area near the basket in basketball
Post (route), route run by a receiver in American football
Posting system, transfer system for professional baseball players moving from a Japanese team to a Major League Baseball team
Post, a method of horseback riding at the trot

Time
The prefix "post" means after, aftermath, or afterward, e.g.,
Jus post bellum, "morality after war"
Postbellum, a period after a war
Post mortem, an autopsy or recap
Post-World War II, the period following World War II

See also

Hitching post (disambiguation)
La Poste (disambiguation)
Pole (disambiguation)
Poste (disambiguation)
Old Post (disambiguation)
Posthaste, a 2012 album by the band OHMphrey
Posting (laundering process), or postadh, a traditional Scottish method of washing clothes